Nadezhda Chemezova (born 28 August 1980 in Kamensk-Uralsky) is a former freestyle  swimmer from Russia. She represented her native country at two consecutive Summer Olympics, starting in 1996.

References

1980 births
Living people
Olympic swimmers of Russia
Swimmers at the 1996 Summer Olympics
Swimmers at the 2000 Summer Olympics
Russian female freestyle swimmers
People from Kamensk-Uralsky
Medalists at the FINA World Swimming Championships (25 m)
European Aquatics Championships medalists in swimming
Universiade medalists in swimming
Universiade silver medalists for Russia
Medalists at the 2001 Summer Universiade
Sportspeople from Sverdlovsk Oblast